The McLaren 720S is a sports car designed and manufactured by British automobile manufacturer McLaren Automotive. It is the second all-new car in the McLaren Super Series, replacing the 650S beginning in May 2017.

The 720S was launched at the Geneva Motor Show on 7 March 2017 and is built on a modified carbon monocoque, which is lighter and stiffer than the previous model, the 650S.

Specifications 
The 720S is the first all-new car to be introduced by McLaren as a part of its new plan to launch 15 new cars into the market by 2022. The 720S according to McLaren is 91% new as compared to its predecessor.

Engine 
The 720S features McLaren's new M840T engine which is an evolution of the M838T used in the 650S. It is a  twin-turbocharged V8 engine.

Suspension 
The ProActive Chassis Control II active suspension system used in the 720S is an evolution of the system used in the 650S but is  lighter than the previous version. The new system features accelerometers on the top and pressure sensors at the bottom of the dampers to precisely communicate to the car's onboard computer the driving conditions in real-time for optimum suspension settings. The system uses findings from a PhD course at the University of Cambridge.

Chassis 

The carbon fibre tub used in the 720S' chassis is based on the similar principle of the MonoCage unit in the P1 but is  lighter than its predecessor. Called the MonoCage II, the tub allows for dihedral doors with large cutouts for easier entry and exit. It also reduces the size of the pillars of the roof, improving visibility for the driver. The same tub underpins the Senna, Speedtail and the Elva sports cars.

Interior 
The interior is designed to be a blend of modern and race-inspired elements. Alcantara and Weir leather upholstery along with carbon fibre trim is standard. A Bowers and Wilkins audio system and fixed carbon fibre racing seats are included as an option. The main focus of the interior is the driver and this is reflected by the new digital display behind the steering wheel which retracts to a thin screen to reveal vital information to the driver when the car is in track mode. The touch screen on the center console is angled towards the driver, and vital controls are designed to be in the driver's easy reach. The car comes with three driving modes: track, sport, and comfort with the first focusing on an enhanced track driving experience.

Performance 
The 720S also comes with Variable Drift Mode, which manipulates the stability control to help drift the car.

Efficiency 
McLaren claims class-leading efficiency for the new 720S, with CO2 emissions of 249 g/km and combined fuel economy of —both of these figures represent an improvement of around 10% from the 650S.

Design 

The McLaren 720S features twin-hinged butterfly doors and many design features from the McLaren F1. The headlights hide air vents that funnel incoming air to two small radiators in front of the wheels. The doors feature air channels that direct air to the engine. The rear of the car features thin LED taillights similar to those on the McLaren P1, and two round exhaust pipes. The design was inspired by the great white shark and features a teardrop-shaped cockpit. All of the exterior features result in an improvement of 50% more downforce than the 650S. The interior of the car includes a folding driver display and carbon fibre accents.

Variants

720S (2017–2022)
The vehicle was unveiled in 2017 Geneva International Motor Show.

The vehicle went on sale on 7 March 2017, with deliveries to customers starting in May 2017.

720S Spider (2018–2022)
The 720S Spider was introduced in December 2018 as the brand's new open-top flagship sports car. Due to the integral roll structure of the monocoque used in the 720S, the Spider did not need additional bracing to compensate for the loss of a fixed roof. The modified monocoque loses the spine running from front to the rear of the car and is dubbed the Monocage II-S. Due to the loss of the roof, the 720S Spider uses traditional dihedral doors. The Spider weighs  more than its coupé counterpart due to the retractable hardtop system. The Spider marks the debut of new 10-spoke alloy wheels and new exterior colour options.

The roof is a single piece of carbon fibre and takes 11 seconds for operation, 6 seconds quicker than the 650S Spider. The Spider uses the "flying buttress" as used on all convertible McLaren models. There is an added window on the buttress of the car to increase rear visibility. The retractable window between the roll-over hoops is carried over from the 650S Spider.

The engine and the transmission remain the same as the coupé with the engine generating the same amount of power.

720S MSO Apex Collection. (Sept 2019–2022) 
The name refers to one of the most important points on racetracks: the apex of a corner. This is the driver’s point of reference at all times, in order to circle the bend on the ideal line and to be able to accelerate out of it as early as possible. Based on the 720S Coupé, McLaren is launching a total of 15 Apex Collection cars in five different designs. On the outside, the presentation vehicles show either white or red paintwork and thus reproduce the typical colors of curbs in the group photos when they are parked next to each other. The press release leaves it open whether other paint colors are also available for the special edition. The inscription ‘Apex Collection’ in front of the rear wheels refers to it. Air intakes, exterior mirrors and the active rear spoiler are made of visible carbon fiber. The wheel arches are filled with ultra-light forged ten-spoke rims and at the rear you can find the tailpipes of the sports exhaust, which comes as standard with the Apex Collection.

The driver and front passenger sit in the well-formed carbon racing seats. As the otherwise optional Track Pack is standard on the MSO Apex Collection, there is a titanium rollbar behind the seats including belt attachment points for six-point harnesses, which provide much more support on the racetrack. The infotainment system includes the McLaren Track Telemetry system (MTT), which allows drivers to keep track of their lap times. In addition, three cameras record vehicle and driver movements to provide the most focused analysis of drives on closed circuits as possible, helping to improve driver skills. From the MSO accessory range, the Apex Collection cars receive extended carbon shift paddles, an Alcantara steering wheel with color-contrasting 12 o’clock mark, a special accelerator pedal and an MSO key cap.

As soon as the doors are opened, you can see the carbon sills, whose inscription refers to the five different design themes.

 Apex Great Britain – 110 mph (the speed of 110 mph is reached by the 720S in Silverstone’s Abbey Corner)
 Apex Germany – 85 mph (the speed of 85 mph is reached by the 720S in the Mobil 1 corner in Hockenheim)
 Apex Belgium – 103 mph (the speed of 103 mph is reached by the 720S in Eau Rouges at Spa-Francorchamps)
 Apex Italy – 90 mph (the speed of 90 mph is reached by the 720S in the Ascari chicane in Monza)

These speeds were reached by professional factory test drivers at the apex of each of the corners mentioned. The Apex Great Britain will be built in two left- and right-hand drive cars each, while the Apex Germany, Apex France, Apex Belgium and Apex Italy editions will be available in one right- and two left-hand drive cars each. First deliveries are expected for October. In the UK, the price per unit is £288,813. Each owner also receives a VIP pass for a Formula 1 race including access to the paddock.

765LT (2020–2022)

Unveiled on 3 March 2020, the 765LT is a limited (765 units worldwide) version of the 720S and the successor to the 675LT as a Super Series Longtail car, focused on track performance.

It also can hit  in 7.0 seconds and complete a quarter-mile dash in 9.9 seconds according to McLaren. In addition, it stopped at 92 feet from 60-0 mph.

The Senna's brake calipers are also available as an extra-cost option; McLaren claims these have four times the thermal conductivity as conventional carbon ceramics, while Pirelli Trofeo R tyres are standard. Suspension changes involve a  reduction in ride height and the use of lightweight main springs with secondary "helper" units as well as an upgraded Proactive Chassis Control system. The aerodynamics are redesigned to produce 25% more downforce than the 720S, featuring front fender vents, a larger front splitter and a longer active wing element at the rear at the cost of less noise insulation, thinner-gauge glass and stiffened engine mounts. The rear of the car also features a quad-exit full titanium exhaust to distinguish it from the 720S. Production was limited to 765 cars globally with customer deliveries in October 2020.

720S Le Mans special edition (2020–2022)
It is a version of 720S coupé celebrating the 25th anniversary of McLaren F1 GTR #59's 1995 24 Hours of Le Mans race win. It includes:
Choice of two body colours (McLaren Orange, Sarthe Grey)
VIN starting with 298 (the number of laps completed by the original race car)
'Ueno Grey'-painted body side lower, rear bumper and front bumper lower
'McLaren 25 anniversary Le Mans' logo on lower body side panel 
Gloss black roof scoop with polycarbonate rear glazing
Carbon fibre louvred front fenders 
Unique 5-spoke LM wheels that based on the design of the #59 F1 GTR wheels, with 'Le Mans' etching
Gold-coloured brake calipers
Gloss black contrast body components 
Choice of two black Alcantara themes with accents in McLaren Orange or Dove Grey 
Carbon fibre racing seats
Embroidered headrests with 'McLaren 25 anniversary Le Mans' logo
12 o'clock steering wheel marker, linked to interior accent colour
Dedication plate with 'McLaren 25 anniversary Le Mans' logo
Floor mats with 'McLaren 25 anniversary Le Mans' logo 
The vehicle went on sale in 2020-06-17.

765LT Spider (2021–2022)

Unveiled on the 27 July 2021, the convertible is a limited (765 units worldwide) version of 765LT coupe. It uses the same M840T engine which produces .

Awards 
 Top Gear - Supercar of the Year 2017
 Festival Automobile International - Most Beautiful Supercar of the Year 2017
 Red Dot Design Awards - Best of the Best 2018
 World Car Awards - 2019 World Performance Car
 IEEE - Top 10 Tech Cars in 2018

The McLaren 720S GT3X won the 2021 Goodwood Festival of Speed hill climb, by setting the fastest time at the shootout final, sprinting up the hill in 45.01 seconds.

Motorsport

720S GT3
The McLaren 720S GT3 is a motorsport version of the 720S designed to take part in GT3 races. The car was revealed in August 2018 with a price of $564,000 and McLaren said that 90% of the car was different from the road-legal 720S. It was originally teased through renderings in November 2017.

720S GT3 Evo 
In 2023, McLaren launched an Evo for the 720S GT3. The evo saw improvements made on aerodynamics and suspension, aimed at improving the car's handling in traffic. The car was available to be purchased brand new, or as an upgrade kit for existing 720S GT3 cars.

720S GT3X (2021–2022)
In March 2021, McLaren announced the 720S GT3X, a track-only car based on the 720S GT3 which isn't limited by the restrictions put in place by the FIA for GT3-class cars.

A McLaren 720S GT3X won 2021 Goodwood Festival hill climb, set the fastest time at the 2021 Goodwood Festival of Speed’s famous hill climb timed shootout final, sprinting up the hill in just 45.01 seconds.

Marketing
LEGO Speed Champions McLaren 720S model kit, which also includes a minifigure car designer with design studio desk, went on sale June 2017.

References

External links

McLaren page: 720S, 720S Spider, 765LT, 765LT Spider
Press kit: 720S, 720S Spider, 765LT, 765LT Spider
Official experience site

720S
Cars introduced in 2017
Rear mid-engine, rear-wheel-drive vehicles
Sports cars
2020s cars